Seyyed Sara (also Romanized as Seyyed Sarā; also known as Sa‘īd Sarā) is a village in Gurab Pas Rural District, in the Central District of Fuman County, Gilan Province, Iran. At the 2006 census, its population was 522, in 118 families.

References 

Populated places in Fuman County